Polladras is a hamlet in west Cornwall, England, United Kingdom. It is situated one mile south of Godolphin Cross and three miles (5 km) northwest of Helston; it is northeast of Tregonning Hill.

Polladras is a group of settlements along two rural roads, inhabited by families and retired people. It includes a campsite at Lower Polladras and a care home.

References

Hamlets in Cornwall